Fire of Love may refer to:

 Fire of Love (1925 film), a German silent film
 Fire of Love (1967 film), a French-Italian drama
 Fire of Love (2022 film), an American-Canadian documentary
 Fire of Love (album), a 1981 album by The Gun Club
 "Fire of Love (Pali się)", Poland's entry in the Eurovision Song Contest 2019